Ellen Liston (1838–1885) was an Australian teacher and a writer of early popular fiction.

Early life 
Ellen Liston was born in England, one of five children of David John and Mary Ann Liston (née Bone). David Liston was a wine and spirit merchant, listed as the landlord of the Dover Castle public house in London in 1848. When Liston was 12 the family migrated to Adelaide, South Australia, on the ship Candahar. The family built a house in Parkside, Idsworth Cottage. Liston was a delicate child and educated at home. Following the death of her parents, she and one unmarried brother were left living at the family home. Liston subsequently worked as a governess on Nikerloo Station near Bramfield on Eyre Peninsula from 1867. In addition to her teaching duties, she claimed to be the only female manager of a sheep station. At this time she began writing, with stories and verses published in the Adelaide Observer under the name "Ellie L." from June 1869.

Career 
Five years later Liston was one of the first intake into the newly organised South Australian State Education system. Her first teaching appointment was at Wellington on the River Murray. As there was no house near the school she lived on the west side of the river, and as a result of this she had, in flood times, to wade through water on her way to and from school. This brought about an illness from which she never fully recovered. Liston resigned from teaching and worked as the first female telegraph operator in the GPO in Adelaide (possibly the first in Australia). She was later mistress  of the Post and Telegraph Office at Watervale and then at Marrabel, where she did most of her writing. She was on the corresponding staff of the Kapunda Herald, where some of her stories and verses were published. She also contributed to the Adelaide Observer. In 1879 Liston won a prize offered by the Melbourne Leader for her serialised novel Auckland Marston, appearing in that newspaper from November 1879 to February 1880. Liston's early work has been compared to the short fiction of Barbara Baynton and Henry Lawson, in their depiction of women alone in an Australian bush setting which is seen as threatening, dangerous and mysterious. Despite two offers of marriage, Liston remained single and much of her work features strong women who lead fulfilling lives.

Later life 
Liston died in 1885, aged 47, in the town of Marrabel, near Kapunda, and is buried in the Kapunda cemetery. The South Australian coastal town of Elliston is believed by some to be named after her.  She left behind an unpublished manuscript for a book, Jean Kesson.

Works

Books 

Pioneers: stories, E.A. Harwood, Hassell Press, Adelaide, 1936
Auckland Marston: An Australian Story, Melbourne Leader, 1879
The Stauntons, The Observer Adelaide, 20 May 1871 Reproduced 13 May - 29 July 1971

Poems 

 'A Cloudy Day', in E.A. Harwood (ed.), Pioneers : stories, Hassell Press, Adelaide, 1936, p. 85.
'To a Summer baby' in E.A. Harwood (ed.), Pioneers : stories, Hassell Press, Adelaide, 1936, p. 85
 'Grandmother's Musings', in E.A. Harwood (ed.), Pioneers : stories, Hassell Press, Adelaide, 1936, p. 8.
 'Truth and Love', in E.A. Harwood (ed.), Pioneers : stories, Hassell Press, Adelaide, 1936, p. 30.
 'Fancies', in E.A. Harwood (ed.), Pioneers : stories, Hassell Press, Adelaide, 1936, pp. 52–53.
 'Mid-Life', in E.A. Harwood (ed.), Pioneers : stories, Hassell Press, Adelaide, 1936, p. 67.
 'A Tumble', in E.A. Harwood (ed.), Pioneers : stories, Hassell Press, Adelaide, 1936, p. 80.
 'Gone', in E.A. Harwood (ed.), Pioneers : stories, Hassell Press, Adelaide, 1936, p. 98.
 'Year's End', in E.A. Harwood (ed.), Pioneers : stories, Hassell Press, Adelaide, 1936, p. 116.
 'The Fire King', in E.A. Harwood (ed.), Pioneers : stories, Hassell Press, Adelaide, 1936, pp. 137–138.

Short stories 

 'Doctor', in E.A. Harwood (ed.), Pioneers : stories, Hassell Press, Adelaide, 1936, pp. 54–66.
 'My Neighbour's Mystery', in E.A. Harwood (ed.), Pioneers : stories, Hassell Press, Adelaide, 1936, pp. 1–7.
 'What They Would Do With It', in E.A. Harwood (ed.), Pioneers: stories, Hassell Press, Adelaide, 1936, pp. 169–177.
 'Our Domestic Helps', in E.A. Harwood (ed.), Pioneers : stories, Hassell Press, Adelaide, 1936, pp. 162–168.
 'Louey and I', in E.A. Harwood (ed.), Pioneers : stories, Hassell Press, Adelaide, 1936, pp. 9–29.
 'Wooden Reunions', in E.A. Harwood (ed.), Pioneers : stories, Hassell Press, Adelaide, 1936, pp. 156–161.
 'The Magic Chestnuts', in E.A. Harwood (ed.), Pioneers : stories, Hassell Press, Adelaide, 1936, pp. 81–84.
 'Our Baggage-Mule', in E.A. Harwood (ed.), Pioneers : stories, Hassell Press, Adelaide, 1936, pp. 139–155.
 'In Memorium: A Sister's Story', in E.A. Harwood (ed.), Pioneers : stories, Hassell Press, Adelaide, 1936, pp. 99–115.
 'How a Woman Kept Her Promise', in E.A. Harwood (ed.), Pioneers : stories, Hassell Press, Adelaide, 1936, pp. 68–79.
 'Tread Upon Roses, But Forget Me Not', in E.A. Harwood (ed.), Pioneers : stories, Hassell Press, Adelaide, 1936, pp. 117–136.
 'Cousin Lucy's Story', in E.A. Harwood (ed.), Pioneers: stories, Hassell Press, Adelaide, 1936, pp. 178–191.
 'Lartius', in E.A. Harwood (ed.), Pioneers : stories, Hassell Press, Adelaide, 1936, pp. 86–97.
 'Effie's Sermon', in E.A. Harwood (ed.), Pioneers : stories, Hassell Press, Adelaide, 1936, pp. 31–51.

References

1838 births
1885 deaths
Australian women novelists
Australian women poets
Writers from South Australia
Australian crime writers
19th-century Australian novelists
19th-century Australian women
Australian feminist writers
Women mystery writers